The following clubs have played in the Canadian Soccer League since its formation in 1998 to the current season. CSL teams playing in the 2017 season are indicated in bold, while founding members of the Canadian Soccer League are shown in italics. As of the 2017 season a total of 37 teams have played in the Canadian Soccer League with seven teams (Hamilton Croatia, London City SC, North York Astros, Toronto Supra, Serbian White Eagles, St. Catharines Wolves, and Toronto Croatia) having played in the predecessor league the Canadian National Soccer League. Two of the eight founder members of the Canadian Soccer League are competing in the 2017 season.

Table

Map

References  

 
Lists of association football clubs